"You Won't Ever Be Lonely" is a song co-written and recorded by American country music singer Andy Griggs. It was released in November 1998 as his debut single, and was served as the lead-off single and title track from his debut album You Won't Ever Be Lonely. It peaked at number 2 on the Billboard Hot Country Singles & Tracks charts.  Griggs wrote the song with Brett Jones.

Chart performance
The song debuted at number 73 on the Hot Country Singles & Tracks chart dated December 12, 1998. It charted for 36 weeks on that chart, making for the sixth-longest chart run by any country music single in the 1990s decade. The song reached a peak of number 2 on the chart dated May 22, 1999. In addition, it reached the Top 40 on the Billboard Hot 100, peaking at number 28 on that chart.

Year-end charts

References

1998 debut singles
1998 songs
Andy Griggs songs
Songs written by Andy Griggs
Songs written by Brett Jones (songwriter)
Song recordings produced by David Malloy
RCA Records Nashville singles